SuperSport is an Albanian group of television sports channels operated by terrestrial telly platform DigitAlb. The channels broadcast a range of different sports such as the English Premier League,  Spanish La Liga, German Bundesliga&Bundesliga 2, Dutch Eredivisie, French Ligue 1&Ligue 2, UEFA Europa League, UEFA Euro, UEFA Europa Conference League, Copa América, ATP 500, ATP 1000, IAAF etc.

Most of the sports events are broadcasting live and in full HD. Also, 3D broadcasts are available; mainly for specific football matches.

For the main events, there is also supporting studio-based programming along with talk shows, which are produced live before and after the matches. For this purpose, from 2010, DigitAlb invested in several TV studios along with live commentary studios to make live broadcasting possible for up to 9 different events.

Supersport Albania is available on the Eutelsat W3C (16.0E) satellite, together with the other DigitAlb channels.

Channels 

SuperSport 1 - Sport news and LIVE events
SuperSport 2 - football matches, SuperSport programs and replays of all sporting events
SuperSport 3 - football matches, SuperSport programs and replays of all sporting events
SuperSport 4 - LIVE events only
SuperSport 5 - LIVE events only
SuperSport 6 - LIVE events only
SuperSport 7 - LIVE events only
SuperSport Kosova 1 - Premier League matches for Kosovo only, via Kujtesa & Artmotion
SuperSport Kosova 2 - Premier League matches for Kosovo only, via Kujtesa & Artmotion
SuperSport Kosova 3 - Premier League matches for Kosovo only, via Kujtesa & Artmotion

Sport Events

Football 

UEFA Europa League 2021/2024 (Albania)
UEFA Europa Conference League 2021/2024 (Albania)
UEFA Nations League 2022/2027 (Albania + Kosovo)
UEFA European Championship qualifying (Albania + Kosovo)
Premier League  all matches per week (2022/2025) (Albania + Kosovo)
La Liga 2021/2026 (Albania)
Bundesliga 2021/2025 (Albania + Kosovo)
Bundesliga 2 2021/2025 (Albania + Kosovo)
Eredivisie 2022/2023 (Albania + Kosovo)
Ligue 1 2021/2024 (Albania)
Ligue 2 2021/2024 (Albania)

Football Cups
Supercopa de España 2019/2022 (Albania + Kosovo)
Coppa Italia 2021/2024 (Albania)
Supercoppa Italiana 2021/2024 (Albaniao)
Coupe de France 2022/2023 (Albania + Kosovo)
Trophée des Champions 2021/2024 (Albania)
DFL-Supercup 2021/2025 (Albania + Kosovo)

Tennis 

 ATP 1000 (2020/2023)
 ATP 500 (2020/2023)

Basketball 

 FIBA International qualifiers (2017 – 2021)

Athletics 

 IAAF Diamond League

Combat Sports 

 UFC (2020/2023)

Rugby 

 Six Nations

See also 
Sports broadcasting contracts in Albania
Sports broadcasting contracts in Kosovo
Dritan Hoxha
Top Channel
DigitAlb

References 

 https://www.supersport.al/
 https://www.supersport.al/kalendari/
 https://www.supersport.al/eventet-sportive/

External links 

 Official website SuperSport
 Official website DigitAlb
 Official website for DigitAlb Swiss
 Channel and transponder list
 Owners website

Digitalb television networks
Television channels and stations established in 1995
1995 establishments in Albania
Mass media in Tirana
Sports television networks